Maktoobat e Ahmad [Urdu- مکتو بات احمد; Letters of Ahmad (1878-1908) ] is a 7-volume collection of all available letters, written by Mirza Ghulam Ahmad in response to the queries and letters of his friends, companions and scholars. The volumes contain some exhaustive treatises on complex issues of religion and metaphysics as well as on matters of fiqh (Islamic jurisprudence). A 3-volume edition comprising these as well newly discovered letters was published in 2008.

References

Works by Mirza Ghulam Ahmad
Urdu-language books
Islamic theology books
19th-century Indian books
20th-century Indian books
Indian non-fiction literature
Indian religious texts